Znaeš Kolku Vredam is the third studio album by Macedonian pop musician, Karolina Gočeva. The album was released in Macedonia and in Serbia, Montenegro, Bosnia & Herzegovina under the Serbo-Croatian title Kad Zvezde Nam Se Sklope... Kao Nekada.

Track listings
"Hipokrit"
"Ljubov Pod Oblacite"
"Od Nebo Do Dno"
"Ne Se Plašam"
"Znaeš Kolku Vredam"
"Sirena"
"Noќ"
"Štom Sakaš"
"Ljubovta E Moja Religija"
"Srešćemo Se Opet" Cover Vlado Janevski Nekogas i negde

Awards

Golden Lady Bug
 Female Singer Of The Year
 Album Of The Year
 Song Of The Year
 Concert Of The Year
 Music Video Of The Year

12 Veličenstveni
 Choice Of The Audience
 Female Singer Of The Year
 Album Of The Year
 Music Video Of The Year

Tin-Šema
 Female Singer Of The Year
 Music Video Of The Year
 Song Of The Year

Chart positions

2003 albums
Karolina Gočeva albums